Navy–Marine Corps Memorial Stadium is an open-air stadium located off the campus of the United States Naval Academy in Annapolis, Maryland. Opened in 1959, it serves as the home stadium of the Navy Midshipmen college football and lacrosse teams, and was the home of the Chesapeake Bayhawks of Major League Lacrosse. The stadium is also the host of the Military Bowl.

The stadium's opener was a 29–2 win over William & Mary on September 26, 1959, and its current seating capacity is 34,000. The attendance record is 38,792, set in 2017 during Navy's 48–45 defeat of Air Force on  Prior to 1959, Navy played its home games at Thompson Stadium, which seated only 12,000. Its site on campus is now occupied by Lejeune Hall, the venue for USNA water sports.

The stadium hosted soccer games as part of the 1984 Summer Olympics. In April 2018, D.C. United of Major League Soccer played a regular season game versus Columbus Crew.

Memorial
The stadium serves as a memorial to the Navy and Marine Corps; it is dedicated to those who have served (and will serve) as upholders of the traditions and renown of the Navy and Marine Corps of the United States. The thousands of memorial bench-back and wall plaques are a constant reminder, as well as the list of numerous battles involving the Naval and Marine Corps forces since the early 1900s.

Renovation

In 2004 the stadium underwent a partial renovation – expanded west side press box- by 360 Architecture with Jay Schwarz – Schwarz+Associates (formerly Alt Breeding Schwarz) acting as the local/Associate Architect.

From 2005 through the present, Jay Schwarz – Schwarz+Associates as the lead Architect has continued to design and develop the expansion and ongoing renovations.  These include a new processional entrance face lift through which the entire Brigade of Midshipmen marches on game days. Additionally, the Schwarz led team has lowered the playing field to increase stadium capacity, designed club seating and associated club lounges, private suites, additional stadium seating (north and south end zones), ADA enhancements, updated restrooms, concessions and stadium operation facilities, new banquet facilities, and renovated locker room facilities.

Playing surface
For its first 46 years, the stadium's playing field was natural grass. Prior to the 2005 football season, the grass field was replaced with FieldTurf, a next-generation infilled synthetic turf.

Jack Stephens Field
The field at Navy–Marine Corps Memorial Stadium is named "Jack Stephens Field", for Jackson T. Stephens (Class of 1947), whose gift aided (1) the renovation of the stadium, (2) the Class of 1947 Legacy project to benefit the Academy's Museum, and (3) other Academy projects.

1984 Summer Olympics

Several first round matches in the association football (soccer) tournament at the 1984 Summer Olympics were played at Navy–Marine Corps Memorial Stadium.

Ice hockey
On March 3, 2018, the Washington Capitals of the National Hockey League hosted the Toronto Maple Leafs in the 2018 NHL Stadium Series, an outdoor regular season hockey game on an ice surface constructed at the stadium.

Military Bowl

Since 2013, Navy–Marine Corps Memorial Stadium has hosted the annual Military Bowl, a post-season National Collegiate Athletic Association-sanctioned Division I college football  bowl game played annually in December, except in 2020 and 2021, when the game was cancelled.

See also
 List of NCAA Division I FBS football stadiums

References

External links

 
World Stadiums.com – photo – Navy – Marine Corps Memorial Stadium
Ballparks.com – NCAA stadiums

Navy Midshipmen football venues
College football venues
College lacrosse venues in the United States
American football venues in Maryland
Lacrosse venues in Maryland
NCAA bowl game venues
Soccer venues in Maryland
Sports venues in the Baltimore metropolitan area
United States Naval Academy buildings and structures
Olympic football venues
Venues of the 1984 Summer Olympics
Sports venues completed in 1959
1959 establishments in Maryland